Jeannette Catherine, Hereditary Princess zu Fürstenberg (née Griesel; born 10 September 1982) is a German businesswoman and entrepreneur.

Early life and education 
Zu Fürstenberg was born on 10 September 1982 in Munich, Bavaria. Her family is originally from Duisburg and owns the measuring technology company Krohne Messtechnik. She studied communications and economics at university in Munich. She studied economics in London and Paris, graduating with a master's degree from the ESCP/EAP. She completed a doctorate in business administration with a focus in entrepreneurship and art during the Renaissance at the Free University of Berlin.

Career 
She has worked for Ernst & Young, Synthesis, and AXA. She is founding partner of La Famiglia VC, a European-based venture capital fund investing in early stage tech companies across Europe and the US. Jeannette zu Fürstenberg has been active in the start-up ecosystem as Co-Founder, investor and advisor since 2013.

In 2011, zu Fürstenberg and her husband founded "Fürstenberg Zeitgenössisch". The project consists of a fellowship programme, annual temporary exhibitions and the establishment of a small collection. The focus is on young, emerging artists who have distinguished themselves in recent years through new concepts and languages of form and have in this context become the focus of international discourse.

Personal life 
On 16 September 2010 she married Christian, Hereditary Prince zu Fürstenberg in a civil ceremony in Donaueschingen. They had a religious ceremony on 25 September 2010 in Rome. Her husband is the oldest son and heir apparent of Heinrich, Prince of Fürstenberg and his wife, Princess Maximiliane of Windisch-Graetz (b. 1952). She gave birth to their first child, Prince Tassilo, on 24 December 2012; their second child, Princess Maria Cecilia, on 11 March 2015; their third child, Prince Tristan, on 22 November 2018 and their fourth child, Princess Leontine, on 25 June 2020.

She began playing polo in 2010, and co-founded the Fürstenberg Polo Club with her husband later that year.

References 

Living people
1982 births
Free University of Berlin alumni
Fürstenberg (princely family)
German princesses
Princesses by marriage
21st-century German businesswomen
21st-century German businesspeople
Businesspeople from Munich